Šaponje is a small farming village in the Sombor municipality of Vojvodina, Serbia.

Populated places in Vojvodina
West Bačka District